Zhang Lu (born August 23, 1987) is a Chinese footballer who plays as a right winger or right-back for Shanghai Shenhua in the Chinese Super League.

Club career
Zhang Lu would start his professional football career with Henan Jianye in the 2006 league season and was part of the squad that won the division title and promotion to the top tier. He would make his first Chinese Super League appearance on 29 April 2007 against Dalian Shide in a 2-1 victory. During the season he would become a squad regular within the team and go on to score his first goal on 15 September 2007 in this time a 3-1 defeat to Dalian Shide. In the following seasons he would establish himself as a vital member within the squad and helped guide the club to their first ever qualification in the Asian Champions League. Within the 2010 AFC Champions League he would play in all six games and scored one goal against Gamba Osaka on 10 March 2010 in a 1-1 draw as Henan were knocked out in the group stages. Unfortunately the club were unable to repeat their achievements in reaching the continental competition and instead soon found themselves relegated at the end of the 2012 league season. Zhang would remain with the club and was part the team that immediately helped win the division title and promotion back into the top tier the following season.   

On 30 December 2014, Zhang transferred to Chinese Super League side Shanghai Shenhua. The Head coach at Shenhua, Francis Gillot would convert Zhang to a from a right winger to a right-back at the beginning of the season and he would play his first game in this position on 8 March 2015 in a league game against Shanghai Shenxin F.C. that ended in a 6-2 victory. The move in position would see Zhang establish himself as a regular within the team and a call-up to the Chinese national team for the first time.

Career statistics 
Statistics accurate as of match played 31 December 2022.

International goals

Henan Jianye

Honours

Club
Henan Jianye
China League One: 2006, 2013

Shanghai Shenhua
Chinese FA Cup: 2017, 2019

References

External links
 
Player profile at sodasoccer.com
Player stats at sohu.com

1987 births
Living people
People from Xinxiang
Chinese footballers
Footballers from Henan
Henan Songshan Longmen F.C. players
Shanghai Shenhua F.C. players
Chinese Super League players
China League One players
Association football midfielders